ZNGF-FM is a Rhythm and Blues radio station in Nassau, Bahamas.

External links 

  (Web archive of last known webpage)

Radio stations in the Bahamas
Rhythmic contemporary radio stations
Urban contemporary radio stations